"My High" is a song by British electronic music duo Disclosure, American rapper Aminé and British rapper Slowthai. It was released as the fourth single from the duo's third studio album Energy on 3 July 2020. The song was written by Howard Lawrence, Guy Lawrence, Adam Daniel and Tyron Frampton. The song was nominated for the 2021 Grammy Awards for "Best Dance Recording".

Background
In a statement, Guy and Howard Lawrence said, "We always wanted to work with rappers, we just didn't know any and we had no means of contacting them… there's not a lot of rappers in Reigate [Surrey, hometown]. Writing My High with Amine was a lot a fun, he's hilarious and may as well be a comedian. He writes so quickly and it's amazing to watch. He brought so much energy to this already very energetic tune that when we got home to London in January there was only one guy capable of matching it… Slowthai."

Music video
A music video to accompany the release of "My High" was first released onto YouTube on 30 June 2020. The video was directed by Simon Cahn. The music video was filmed in Mexico City and Los Angeles. It follows a car accident victim as he tries to get medical attention and instead is thrust forth while on a stretcher through an increasingly absurd series of settings including a family dinner, a house party and a dollar store. Aminé and Slowthai both make appearances.

Track listing
Digital download
"My High" – 4:54

Digital download
"My High" (edit) – 3:12

Charts

Release history

References

2020 songs
2020 singles
Disclosure (band) songs
Aminé (rapper) songs
Hip house songs
Island Records singles
Songs written by Aminé (rapper)
Songs written by Guy Lawrence
Songs written by Howard Lawrence
Songs written by Slowthai
Slowthai songs